John Ponsonby, 1st Viscount Ponsonby, GCB (c. 1770 – 22 February 1855) was a longtime British diplomat and politician. He was considered an exceptionally handsome man – reportedly he was almost lynched as an aristocrat in a Paris street by a revolutionary mob in the 1790s  but saved by the intervention of a mob of women who saved him because he was so pretty.

Political career
Ponsonby, born about 1770, was the eldest son of  William Ponsonby, 1st Baron Ponsonby, and Louisa Molesworth, and brother of Major-General Sir William Ponsonby. He served as a Member of Parliament (MP) in the Irish House of Commons for Tallow between 1793 and 1797. Elected in 1798 for both Banagher and Dungarvan, he chose to sit for the latter from 1798 to the Act of Union in 1800/01. He then represented Galway Borough in the United Kingdom House of Commons until 1802.

Diplomatic career
On the death of his father on 5 November 1806, Ponsonby succeeded him as Baron Ponsonby, and for some time held an appointment in the Ionian Islands. On 28 February 1826, he went to Buenos Aires as envoy-extraordinary and minister-plenipotentiary until 1828, and moved then to Rio de Janeiro in the same capacity. An exceptionally handsome man, he was sent, it was reported, to South America by George Canning to please King George IV, who was envious of the attention paid him by Lady Conyngham. Once there he greatly fostered the independence of Uruguay as a buffer state between Argentina and Brazil, to the benefit of British commerce and overall peace. In December 1830 he was entrusted with a special mission to Belgium, in connection with the candidature of Prince Leopold of Saxe-Coburg to the Belgian throne, and remained in Brussels until Leopold was elected king on 4 June 1831. His dealings in this matter were adversely criticised in The Guet-à-Pens Diplomacy, or Lord Ponsonby at Brussels, … London, 1831, but the Prime Minister, Lord Grey, eulogised him in the House of Lords on 25 June 1831. Thus, as a diplomat, he was sent twice by the British Empire to promote the instauration of buffer states to protect its interests, Uruguay and Belgium, both of which survive to this very day, still deeply similar to their bigger neighbours. In addition to this, Ponsonby served as envoy to Naples from 8 June to 9 November 1832, as ambassador at Constantinople from 27 November 1832 to 1841, and as ambassador at Vienna from 10 August 1846 to 31 May 1850.

Later life
Through Lord Grey, who had married his sister Mary Elizabeth, he had great influence, but his conduct as an ambassador sometimes caused official embarrassment, notably when he accompanied the emperor to Innsbruck in 1848. He was a keen diplomat of the "old school", a shrewd observer, and a man of large views and strong will. He was gazetted G.C.B. on 3 March 1834, and created Viscount Ponsonby, of Imokilly in the County of Cork, on 20 April 1839. He had previously married, on 13 January 1803, Lady Frances Villiers, seventh daughter of George Villiers, 4th Earl of Jersey. She died at 62 Chester Square, London, on 14 April 1866, having had no issue. Ponsonby published "Private Letters on the Eastern Question, written at the date thereon," Brighton, 1854, and died at Brighton on 21 February 1855. The viscountcy thereupon became extinct, but the barony devolved on his nephew William, son of Sir William Ponsonby.

References 

Mosley, Charles (editor). (1999). Burke's Peerage & Baronetage, 106th edition.

Attribution:

External links 

1770 births
1855 deaths
Diplomatic peers
Irish MPs 1790–1797
Irish MPs 1798–1800
Knights Grand Cross of the Order of the Bath
John Ponsonby, 1st Viscount Ponsonby
Viscounts in the Peerage of the United Kingdom
Eldest sons of British hereditary barons
UK MPs 1801–1802
UK MPs who were granted peerages
UK MPs who inherited peerages
Members of the Parliament of the United Kingdom for County Galway constituencies (1801–1922)
Ambassadors of the United Kingdom to the Ottoman Empire
Ambassadors of the United Kingdom to Portugal
Ambassadors of the United Kingdom to the Kingdom of the Two Sicilies
Ambassadors of the United Kingdom to Argentina
Members of the Parliament of Ireland (pre-1801) for County Waterford constituencies
Members of the Parliament of Ireland (pre-1801) for King's County constituencies
Peers of the United Kingdom created by Queen Victoria